Genoplesium sagittiferum, commonly known as the horned midge orchid, is a species of small terrestrial orchid that is endemic to New South Wales. It has a single thin leaf fused to the flowering stem and up to ten small, yellowish-green flowers with a hairy reddish labellum.

Description
There is a tapered, dark red callus in the centre of the labellum and extending nearly to its tip. Flowering occurs between February and May.

Taxonomy and naming
The horned midge orchid was first formally described in 1942 by Herman Rupp who gave it the name Prasophyllum sagittiferum. The type specimen was collected near Bell by Erwin Nubling and his wife and the description was published in The Victorian Naturalist. In 1989, David Jones and Mark Clements changed the name to Genoplesium sagittiferum and in 2002 Jones and Clements changed the name again to Corunastylis sagittifera but the latter changes is not accepted by the Australian Plant Census. The specific epithet (sagittiferum) is from the Latin words sagitta meaning "arrow" and fero meaning "to bear" or "to carry" referring to the arrowhead shape of the labellum callus.

Distribution and habitat
Genoplesium sagittiferum grows with shrubs in sandy soils, sometimes in moss gardens on rock ledges. It is found in the higher parts of the Blue Mountains.

References

sagittiferum
Endemic orchids of Australia
Orchids of New South Wales
Plants described in 1927